Schmutziger Engel (Dirty Angel) is a German film made in 1958, directed by Alfred Vohrer.

Cast

Censorship in Italy
When Schmutziger Angel was first released in Italy in 1959 the Committee for the Theatrical Review of the Italian Ministry of Cultural Heritage and Activities reviewed the film. In order for the film to be screened publicly, the Committee recommended the removal of the frames in which a female character exposed her breasts. The reason for the restriction, cited in the official documents, is that the sequence is considered to be offensive to decency.

References

External links

1958 films
1958 drama films
German drama films
West German films
1950s German-language films
Films directed by Alfred Vohrer
Films set in schools
1950s German films